Damien Michael Woody (born November 3, 1977) is a former American football offensive guard who played for the New England Patriots, Detroit Lions and New York Jets of the National Football League (NFL).  He played college football for Boston College.  He was drafted as a center by the Patriots in the first round, 17th overall in the 1999 NFL Draft.  During his pro career, he played every position on the offensive line.  A Pro Bowl selection in 2002, Woody won two Super Bowl rings with the Patriots.

Early years
Woody attended Patrick Henry High School in Ashland, Virginia, where he teamed with Erron Kinney and helped the Patrick Henry Patriots win the 1994 state football championship. He played college football for Boston College in Chestnut Hill, Massachusetts.

Professional career

New England Patriots
The Patriots selected him 17th overall in the first round of the 1999 draft. Woody would go on to start 76 games with the Patriots, mostly at center.

Woody was known to struggle with delivering the snap in the shotgun formation.  When a play was called that required a shotgun snap to the quarterback, Woody would rotate to the guard position.

As the anchor of a tough and effective New England offensive line, Woody was a member of two Super Bowl-winning teams, in 2001 and 2003. He did not play in Super Bowl XXXVIII against the Carolina Panthers because of a knee injury.

Detroit Lions
Woody signed as a free agent with the Detroit Lions in March 2004 and started every game in the 2004 and 2005 seasons before missing most of 2006 on injured reserve. His play earned him a selection as a Pro Bowl alternate in 2004.

New York Jets
On March 2, 2008, Woody and the Jets agreed to a five-year, $25 million contract with $11 million in guaranteed money.

During the Jets' post-season run during the 2010 season, Woody suffered a torn Achilles tendon in a victory over the Indianapolis Colts on January 8, 2011. Woody was subsequently placed on the injured reserve list on January 12, 2011. Following the injury, Woody was released by the Jets on February 28, 2011.

Woody announced his retirement on July 26, 2011.

Broadcasting career
On August 5, 2011, Woody joined ESPN as an NFL analyst. He can be seen on SportsCenter, NFL Live, Fantasy Football Now, and other shows.

Personal life
Woody is a Christian. Woody is married to Nicole Woody. They have seven children: Kamille, Jalynn, Alexandra, Domonique, Deuce, Dontrell, and Jacoby.

Woody was a contestant on Season 16 of the reality competition The Biggest Loser, which premiered on September 11, 2014, on NBC under the name The Biggest Loser: Glory Days, appearing along with former NFL quarterback Scott Mitchell.

Woody is a fan of the NHL's New York Islanders.

References

External links
Damien Woody Official website
Detroit Lions bio
New England Patriots bio
Pro Football Reference

1977 births
Living people
African-American players of American football
American Conference Pro Bowl players
American football centers
American football offensive guards
American football offensive tackles
Boston College Eagles football players
Detroit Lions players
ESPN people
National Football League announcers
New England Patriots players
New York Jets players
People from Hanover County, Virginia